Cloten was the king of Dyfed and Brycheiniog in Southern Wales in the 7th century.

Already the king of Dyfed, he married Princess Ceindrech of Brycheiniog c. 650, briefly uniting the two kingdoms; they would be divided again after his son's reign.

References

|-

Year of birth missing
Year of death missing
Monarchs of Dyfed
Monarchs of Brycheiniog
7th-century Welsh monarchs